Zaytuna F.C. United is a Ghanaian professional football club based in Amanfro, Accra, Greater Accra. They are currently competing in the Ghana Poly Tank Division One League, formerly of Ghana Premier League.

History
Zaytuna FC, formally known as Stay Cool, was formed on 17 December 1997 by the Club president/CEO Alhaji Franko Lamtey. The club started at the second division level and competed with eighteen other teams at that level at the time.

Within two years of its existence, the club set a record of playing 30 consecutive league matches without a defeat at the Second Division. It was promoted to the First Division in the year 1999.

At the Division One League, the club launched a campaign from the year 2000 to get a qualification to the Premiership and was finally rewarded in 2003. It came second in the league; hence, the club got promoted to the Premier Division.

Due to capital intensive natures of the premier division, as the club was solely being financed by the Presided of the club, it was relegated after a year at the premiership.

In the year 2004, the club changed its name from Stay Cool FC to Zaytuna FC, launched another campaign to the premiership and qualified again to the premiership 2006.

The premiership home games were played at the El Wak Stadium. In order to overcome the financial challenges, the club entered into partnership with a local partner. Per the term of the partnership, the partner was given controlling stake in the club. Lack of experience by the new managers cost the club; it was relegated again to the Division One in the 2008.

Current squad

References

External links
 Official Website

Football clubs in Ghana
Football clubs in Accra
1997 establishments in Ghana
Association football clubs established in 1997